Montreal Island is located in Chantrey Inlet, Nunavut, Canada.

Sir George Back visited the island in 1834 after descending Back River which now bears his name. He left a cache of supplies on the island, which was found in 1839 on a later Arctic expedition by the Scottish explorer Thomas Simpson. Around 1850 some survivors of Franklin's lost expedition probably reached the island. In 1855 James Anderson and James Stewart of the Hudson's Bay Company descended Back River, crossed to the island and found Franklin relics.

References
Montreal Island at the Atlas of Canada

Uninhabited islands of Kitikmeot Region